NGC 1893 is an open cluster in the constellation Auriga. It is about 12,400 light years away. The star cluster is embedded in the HII region IC 410. 

Images of the star cluster by the Chandra X-ray Observatory suggest that it contains approximately 4,600 young stellar objects.

References

External links
 
 Image NGC 1893

 
 

NGC 1893
1893
Auriga (constellation)
Star-forming regions